Clayton-le-Dale is a civil parish in Ribble Valley, Lancashire, England.  It contains five listed buildings that are recorded in the National Heritage List for England.  Of these, one is at Grade II*, the middle grade, and the others are at Grade II, the lowest grade.  The parish contains the village of Clayton-le-Dale and surrounding countryside.  The listed buildings consist of houses, a former toll house, and a bridge.

Key

Buildings

References

Citations

Sources

Lists of listed buildings in Lancashire
Buildings and structures in Ribble Valley